Ingenio may refer to:

Portuguese
 Engenho, a word meaning "ingenious" or "mill".

Spanish "sugar mill"
Ingenio, Las Palmas  municipality in the eastern part of the island of Gran Canaria
Valle de los Ingenios, also named Valley de los Ingenios or Valley of the Sugar Mills
Ingenio La Trinidad, Tucumán settlement in northern Argentina
Ingenio River
Ingenio District

Latin "ingenuity"
Ingenio et Arti (from Latin: For Spirit and Art) Danish medal awarded to prominent Danish and foreign scientists and artists.
Ingenio (satellite)